Carlos Valdés or Valdez may refer to:

Carlos Valdes (actor) (born 1989), Colombian-American actor and musician;
Carlos Valdés (footballer) (born 1985), Colombian footballer;
Carlos Valdez (Guatemalan footballer) (born 1945), Guatemalan footballer;
Carlos "Patato" Valdes (1926–2007), Cuban percussionist;
Carlos Valdez (footballer, born 1983), Uruguayan footballer;
Carlos Valdez (baseball) (born 1971), former Major League Baseball pitcher.

See also 
Carlos De Valdez (1894–1939), Peruvian film actor.